Darren Jernigan is a Democratic member of the Tennessee House of Representatives, representing the 60th district (Hermitage, Donelson, and Old Hickory). He was first elected in 2012, taking office in January 2013. Jernigan also served on the Nashville City Council.

References

External links
 
Legislative website

Living people
1969 births
Democratic Party members of the Tennessee House of Representatives
Tennessee city council members
Politicians from Biloxi, Mississippi
Metropolitan Council members (Nashville, Tennessee)
Austin Peay State University alumni
Middle Tennessee State University alumni
21st-century American politicians
People from Old Hickory, Tennessee